Johnny Cage is a fictional character in the Mortal Kombat fighting game franchise by Midway Games/NetherRealm Studios. Introduced in the original 1992 game, he is an action movie star with an extensive martial arts background. The series depicts Cage as one of the primary heroes defending Earthrealm from various threats, as well as the comic foil. In the rebooted timeline, Cage is also the love interest to Special Forces officer Sonya Blade and the father of their daughter Cassie. He is inspired by martial arts star Jean-Claude Van Damme, particularly Van Damme's character in the 1988 film Bloodsport.

A staple of the franchise, Cage has appeared in various media outside of the games. Reception to the character has been generally positive for his role in the series, character development, gameplay, and Fatality finishing moves.

Appearances

Mortal Kombat games
Introduced in the original Mortal Kombat (1992), Johnny Cage is a martial artist and actor who enters the Shaolin Tournament to prove that he does not rely on special effects in his films. Additionally, he is the only character in the game who does not share a past history with the other characters. He is tricked into entering the tournament by the sorcerer Shang Tsung, believing it would prove his skills are real and improve his marketability. Upon arriving at the tournament, however, he learns the truth from the thunder god Raiden and aligns himself with the Earthrealm warriors.

In the sequel Mortal Kombat II (1993), Cage disappears from the set of his latest film after following Mortal Kombat champion Liu Kang to the otherworldly dimension of Outworld, where he joins forces with other fighters in participating in a second tournament during their successful attempt to protect Earthrealm from Outworld's evil emperor, Shao Kahn.

Cage is absent from the series continuity until the 1996 compilation title Mortal Kombat Trilogy, which expands on the events of Mortal Kombat 3 (1995) and its upgrade. He is killed by Shao Kahn's forces during an invasion of Earth, but his path to the afterlife is blocked due to a merger of Earth and Outworld, which restores his soul and enables him to help his comrades defeat Shao Kahn, after which he ascends to the heavens.

In Mortal Kombat 4 (1997), at Cage's request, Raiden restores him to life so he can again fight alongside his friends, this time in an attempt to defeat the forces of the disgraced former deity Shinnok.

In Mortal Kombat: Deadly Alliance (2002), Cage shoots a movie based on his death and resurrection titled The Death of Johnny Cage, but he is displeased with his characterization and promptly flees the production when Raiden transports him to a new mission in Outworld. However, he and his fellow Earthrealm warriors are killed in their attempt to stop the titular Deadly Alliance from resurrecting the Dragon King Onaga. In Mortal Kombat: Deception (2004), the first fighting installment in which Cage is not playable, he and the Earthrealm warriors are resurrected by Onaga for use as his slaves, but they are eventually freed from their mind control by reformed ninja Ermac and the spirit of Liu Kang, who had also been slain by the Deadly Alliance.

Cage returns along with the series' then-entire playable roster in Mortal Kombat: Armageddon (2006), participating in the final tournament that would decide mankind's fate. He is one of only seventeen characters to receive an official game biography, in which he becomes the de facto leader of Earthrealm's forces after he sees multiple visions of Shinnok and tracks him down to Shang Tsung's island, where Shinnok plots to take over Shao Kahn's empire. Cage is killed a third time along with the other combatants in a battle royal at the Pyramid of Argus in the realm of Edenia in the game's opening sequence.

In the rebooted continuity of Mortal Kombat (2011), Cage is described as "a descendant of an ancient Mediterranean cult who bred warriors for the gods" as an explanation for his special powers. His disembodied head is seen amidst the fighters' corpses in the introduction sequence that depicts the grisly aftermath of the battle and the resulting onset of Armageddon. The storyline then travels back in time to the Shaolin Tournament, where cocky and talkative martial arts actor Johnny Cage enters the competition as a publicity stunt and repeatedly flirts with Special Forces lieutenant Sonya Blade. He initially considers the tournament a joke after defeating Outworld warriors Reptile and Baraka, until Raiden informs him of the consequences should Outworld emerge victorious, which convinces Cage to fight alongside Raiden's chosen heroes. However, he is later defeated in the competition by Earthrealm assassin Cyrax. During the second tournament, Cage is eliminated by Ermac, before Raiden saves him from the centaur Motaro. After Shao Kahn launches an invasion of Earthrealm and his wife Queen Sindel slaughters the rest of their comrades, Cage and Sonya are left as the only survivors.

In Mortal Kombat X (2015), which takes place two years after the previous game, Cage inadvertently discovers his special powers while attempting to rescue Sonya from Shinnok and assists Raiden in imprisoning Shinnok inside a magical amulet. He and Sonya later get married and have a daughter, Cassie, but they divorce due to Sonya's commitment to her career. A further twenty-five years later, Cage becomes part of a secret Special Forces unit under Sonya's command. With help from his followers, Shinnok escapes from his amulet, kidnaps Cage, and corrupts the source of Earthrealm's life force. However, Cassie is able to defeat Shinnok, rescue her father, and reunite the Cage family.

In Mortal Kombat 11, which takes place two years after MKX, Johnny and Cassie grieve over Sonya's death during a Special Forces attack on the Netherrealm. After the keeper of time Kronika causes a time anomaly in an attempt to remove Raiden from history, past versions of Johnny and Sonya are brought to the present. Disgusted by his younger self's arrogance and misconduct around his version of Sonya, the present Johnny works with him to improve his attitude. Though the older Johnny successfully defends the Special Forces base from the Black Dragon crime cartel and cyber Lin Kuei warriors, he is injured in battle, while his and Sonya's younger counterparts are kidnapped and forced to fight for the Black Dragon's entertainment. Cassie leads a Special Forces unit to rescue them and the younger Johnny becomes inspired to be more like his future self. In the DLC story expansion Aftermath, the younger Johnny attempts to take part in a joint Earthrealm/Outworld assault on Kronika's keep, only to be ambushed by Shao Kahn and Sindel, who takes him and his family prisoner.

Character design and gameplay

Original concept sketches for a proposed fighting game by artist John Tobias showed a character called "Michael Grimm, the current box office champion and star of such movies as Dragon's Fist, Dragon's Fist II and the award-winning Sudden Violence." Tobias later described them as "R-rated really schlocky 1980s martial arts films".

Midway Games had hoped to license martial artist and actor Jean-Claude Van Damme for a fighting game that was intended to be modeled after Van Damme's 1988 film Bloodsport. The company created a short demo reel that consisted of film footage of Van Damme inserted into a digital background in order to convince the actor to join the project, an attempt that was unsuccessful. When the game later became Mortal Kombat, the Michael Grimm character was retained as a spoof of Van Damme and renamed Johnny Cage, with Van Damme's split-legged groin punch from Bloodsport consequently included as one of Cage's special moves. According to martial artist Daniel Pesina, who portrayed Cage in the original game and the 1993 sequel Mortal Kombat II, the character was additionally modeled after Daniel Rand from the Power Man and Iron Fist comic series.

Cage's real name of John Carlton was taken from Midway artist and programmer John Carlton, who worked on the NBA Jam arcade game series. Cage was the first character created for Mortal Kombat, and the test prototype of the original game had just two Cage characters fighting each other. In a 1995 interview with Electronic Gaming Monthly, Tobias said that Cage's Fatality finishing move of punching off his opponent's head was the final one created for the game, before which he was going to simply throw his opponent across the screen. Pesina, in 2018, claimed that he himself had invented the finisher and it was the first one created. Due to a falling-out with and ensuing 1994 lawsuit against Midway, Pesina was replaced by Chris Alexander as Cage for the 1996 compilation title Mortal Kombat Trilogy.

As a narcissistic Hollywood star, Cage serves as comic foil in contrast to the games' more serious characters like Liu Kang and Raiden, which is embellished in the 2011 Mortal Kombat reboot game with a large chest tattoo of his name. Cage's main role in Mortal Kombat X is as a Special Forces consultant instead of an actor; his design by NetherRealm Studios (formerly Midway Games) was their attempt to define whether or not he had taken his martial arts skills seriously since the aftermath of the 2011 reboot game, and he was outfitted in tactical gear that was designed to fit his fighting style while finding the balance between "serious or stoic" and "too goofy". In Mortal Kombat X, Cage's gameplay style is split into three fighting variations like those of the other playable characters; Prima Games deemed him effective at zoning.

Other appearances

In the animated direct-to-video prequel Mortal Kombat: The Journey Begins, released four months prior to the feature film, Johnny Cage (voiced by Jeff Bennett) is en route to Shang Tsung's island along with Sonya and Liu Kang, while Raiden informs them of the Mortal Kombat tournament's origins and the dangers they will face.

In the 1995 feature film Mortal Kombat, Johnny Cage was played by Linden Ashby and is one of Raiden's three chosen warriors with Liu Kang and Sonya, and he takes part in the tournament to prove he is a legitimate fighter after Shang Tsung assumes the identity of Cage's sensei in order to trick him into participating. He defeats Scorpion and Goro, and is selected by Shang Tsung to fight him in final combat near the conclusion until Liu Kang accepts the challenge. Ashby who had practiced martial arts before he was cast in the role. Ashby would later lend his voice and likeness to a downloadable skin for Cage in Mortal Kombat 11.

Ashby did not return for the 1997 sequel Mortal Kombat: Annihilation and was replaced by Chris Conrad. During Shao Kahn's invasion of Earth in the beginning of the film, Cage is killed by the emperor in his attempt to save Sonya after she is taken hostage. Pat E. Johnson, the first film's stunt choreographer, recommended Conrad as Ashby's replacement to Annihilation's producers.

Martial artist Matt Mullins portrayed Cage in director Kevin Tancharoen's 2010 short film Mortal Kombat: Rebirth. Cage is a faltering action star who works undercover for police officer Jackson Briggs, but Baraka kills him in a brutal fight. Mullins reprised the role in one episode of Tancharoen's 2011 web series Mortal Kombat: Legacy, in which Cage is revised as an unemployed television actor who had starred in Power Rangers. Desperate to revive his flailing career, he pitches reality show pilots that show him engaging in acts of vigilantism by beating up various criminals, but they are rejected by two executives. Cage later overhears one of them stealing his ideas while proposing a new show to another actor, and he assaults the executive along with two security guards. He is then approached by Shang Tsung as the episode concludes. Casper Van Dien replaced Mullins for the 2013 second season, appearing in four of ten episodes. Cage had refused Shang Tsung's proposition from the previous season to fight for Outworld and reluctantly agrees to join Raiden's warriors in participating in the tournament. He is defeated by Mileena in battle but rescued by Kitana before Mileena can kill him, and in the season finale, he and Stryker are attacked by Liu Kang, who has betrayed Earthrealm to fight for Outworld. Van Dien compared his career trajectory to that of Cage in a 2013 interview with MTV.

Cage appears in the animated films Mortal Kombat Legends: Scorpion's Revenge (2020) and the sequel Mortal Kombat Legends: Battle of the Realms (2021). He is voiced by Joel McHale, who will reprise the role for the next film in the Legends series that will focus on Cage and is set for release in 2023.

Cage was excluded from the 2021 live-action feature film Mortal Kombat; director Simon McQuoid explained that the cast of main characters was already established when he had joined the production, plus he felt that Cage was "a very tricky, complex character" and a "big personality ... that has such a gravitational force around him [that] everything would have started to orbit around him."

In Malibu Comics' Mortal Kombat comic book series that ran from 1994 to 1995, Cage first features with the characters from the original game in the 1994 six-issue Blood & Thunder miniseries, which loosely follows the game's storyline of Shang Tsung hosting the Shaolin Tournament. In the follow-up miniseries Battlewave (1995), which focuses mainly on the new characters introduced in Mortal Kombat II, Cage has resumed his acting career but later travels to Outworld with Jax to investigate an attack carried out by Goro. The series additionally featured an original character in Cage's personal bodyguard Bo. Cage is a supporting character in DC Comics' 2015 twelve-issue Mortal Kombat X miniseries, with a chapter in the eighth issue devoted to the background of his relationship with Sonya.

Merchandise and promotion
Cage has been licensed for various action figures produced by Hasbro, Toy Island, and Jazwares. Advanced Graphics released a life-sized Cage cardboard standee in 2011, and Syco Collectibles released a polystone character statuette in 2012.

Reception 
Cage has been rated among the top Mortal Kombat characters by various gaming media publications, and his Fatality finishing moves over the course of his series appearances have been positively received. Brad Nicholson of Destructoid enthused in 2008 that Cage was "easily the best character in a fighting game ever," and Marcin Górecki of Polish gaming magazine Secret Service ranked Cage the second-best male fighting-game character in 1996, behind Ryu from the Street Fighter franchise. However, Shea Serrano of Grantland rated Cage the second-worst of Mortal Kombat II's twelve characters in 2012, on the basis of his skill being "overtaken almost entirely by his own ego." In her 2015 review of Mortal Kombat X, Maddy Myers of Eurogamer questioned what she felt was the implausibility of the "white-as-snow" union of Cage and Sonya. Justin Clark of Slant considered Cage to be among the "older, self-serious dinosaurs wrestling with relevance" in Mortal Kombat X, his cocky attitude notwithstanding.

Critical reception of Cage's characterization in the Mortal Kombat games and alternate media has been mixed. Chris Buffa of GameDaily wrote: "If you can't marry Brad Pitt, you can always settle for Mortal Kombat's Johnny Cage." GamesRadar considered Cage a combination of Jean-Claude Van Damme, Nicolas Cage, and Robert Downey, Jr. Writing for Complex, Elton John declared that Cage "embodies Hollywood's overpaid jerk persona perfectly," while Hanuman Welch considered Cage an exemplification of overconfidence and self-delusion, as well as a "spokesperson of the obnoxious Ed Hardy crowd." Mark Walton of GameSpot castigated Cage in the 2011 reboot game as sexist and arrogant. In their review of Mortal Kombat 11, the Washington Post enjoyed the interactions presented between the young and the old Cage as they gave elements that helped to make the narrative more appealing. 

Gavin Jasper of Den of Geek praised Linden Ashby's performance in the first Mortal Kombat film as "a perfect idea of" Cage's personality. R. L. Shaffer of IGN was critical of Cage's "illogical character arc" as a former Power Rangers actor in Mortal Kombat: Legacy as he felt it was "disconnected" from Cage's role in the games, but Carl Lyon of Fearnet opined in his 2013 second-season review that Casper Van Dien's portrayal of the character made Cage "the loveable  asshole we all know and love."

See also
Dan Hibiki

Notes

References

External links 
 

Action film characters
Fictional American people in video games
Fictional Jeet Kune Do practitioners
Fictional karateka
Fictional actors
Fictional characters from Los Angeles
Fictional fist-load fighters
Fictional male martial artists
Fictional martial artists in video games
Fictional nunchakuka
Fictional shotokan practitioners
Male characters in video games
Mortal Kombat characters
Parody superheroes
Video game characters based on real people
Video game characters introduced in 1992
Video game characters with superhuman strength
Video game protagonists